Constantin Negruzzi (first name often Costache ; 1808–24 August 1868) was a Romanian poet, novelist, translator, playwright, and politician.

Born in Trifeștii Vechi, Moldavia, he studied at home with a Greek teacher. He admitted in a later article that he learnt Romanian by himself, from a book written by Petru Maior. During the 1821 Revolution, his family took refuge in Chișinău, Bessarabia, where he met Alexander Pushkin and became interested in literature.

Notable among his writings are his memoirs – Amintiri din junețe ("Memories of youth") – and his historical writings, Fragmente istorice ("Historical fragments"), Negru in alb ("Black in white"), Aprodul purice (an aprod was a minor noble title, typically the son of a lord; Purice is a proper name, but literally means "flea"; see Movilești). He translated some of the ballads of Victor Hugo, some of Thomas Moore's poetry and Antiochus Kantemir's poetry. Negruzzi wrote two plays, Muza de la Burdujeni ("The Muse of Burdujeni") and Cârlani ("Lambs"), while translating several other plays.

Negruzzi also held several functions, including finance minister and deputy under Sturdza-Vodă. A supporter of liberal causes, he was twice exiled to his house in Trifești for criticism of the government. His son was the writer Iacob Negruzzi.

See also
Costache Negruzzi National College

References
 (1897) Dicționarul contimporanilor, Editura Lito-Tipografiei "Populara"

External links

Biography of Costache Negruzzi

Romanian poets
Romanian male poets
Romanian translators
Romanian memoirists
Government ministers of the Principality of Moldavia
Founding members of the Romanian Academy
People from Iași County
1808 births
1868 deaths
19th-century Romanian people
19th-century translators
Male dramatists and playwrights
19th-century poets
19th-century Romanian dramatists and playwrights
19th-century male writers
19th-century memoirists